Idiot Proverbs is the debut studio album by Australian indie rock band Tiny Little Houses. It was released through Ivy League Records in January 2018. Australian radio station Triple J picked Idiot Proverbs as their feature album of the week in January 2018.

Track listing

LP Extended Edition

Personnel 
Credits adapted from album's liner notes.

Tiny Little Houses
 Caleb Karvountzis – vocals, guitar
 Sean Mullins – guitar
 Al Yamin – bass
 Clancy Bond – drums

Production
 Steven Schram – Producer, Audio Engineer and Mixer
 Fergus Miller – Co-Producer on "Garbage Bin"
 Joe Carra – Mastering

Art
 Ella Palij – Cover Photograph
 Clancy Bond – Cover Photograph
 Caleb Karvountzis – Clay Figure
 Lisa Dotorre – Back Cover Painting
 Luke Macmahon – Cover Layout and Text

Charts

References 

2018 debut albums
Tiny Little Houses albums
Ivy League Records albums